Stormland is a 2011 Icelandic comedy film directed by Marteinn Thorsson, based on Hallgrímur Helgason's 2005 novel, Rokland.

Plot
Stormland tells the story of Böðvar "Böddi" Steingrímsson, an anti-establishment man who hates popular culture and idolizes certain characters from Icelandic sagas. He lives in the small town of Krókur with his overprotective mother, after having spent ten years studying philosophy in Germany. A series of mishaps befalls him as he struggles to adapt to his new life. He finds his mother dead in front of the television, gets fired from his teaching job, has a fight with a local business owner, is rejected by the woman he loves, and ends up killing his brother.

Cast
 Ólafur Darri Ólafsson as Böðvar "Böddi" Steingrímsson
 Hilmir Snær Guðnason as Árni Valur
 Þorsteinn Bachmann as Toni Group
 Jóhann Sigurðarson as Albert
 Þórhallur Sigurðsson as Keli
 Steinn Ármann Magnússon as Manni Volgu
 Elma Lísa Gunnarsdóttir as Dagga
 Lilja Guðrún Þorvaldsdóttir as Aðalbjörg - Dagga's Mother
 Stefán Jónsson as Doctor
 Magnús Ragnarsson as Þóroddur
 Víkingur Kristjánsson as Einar Alberts
 Stefán Hallur Stefánsson as Viddi

References

External links
 

2011 films
2011 comedy films
2010s Icelandic-language films
Icelandic comedy films